Minasville is a small community in the Canadian province of Nova Scotia, located in  The Municipality of the District of East Hants in Hants County.

The home of the Mariner of Minasville Captain William Scott (1846-1934). He served in the American Civil War and fought in the Seven Days Battle.  A film about his life premiered at the Atlantic Film Festival (See Mariner of Minasville).

References
Minasville on Destination Nova Scotia

Communities in Hants County, Nova Scotia
General Service Areas in Nova Scotia